is a Japanese football manager and former player.

Club career
Nishino was born in Saitama on 7 April 1955. After graduating from Waseda University, he joined Hitachi in 1978. The club won the 2nd place at 1980 JSL Cup and 1982 Japan Soccer League. He retired in 1990. He was elected Best Eleven in 1985–86.

International career
In March 1977, when Nishino was a Waseda University student, he was selected in Japan national team for 1978 World Cup qualification. At this qualification, on 6 March, he debuted against Israel. He played 12 games and scored 1 goal for Japan until 1978.

Managerial career
After retirement, in 1990, Nishino became a coach for Hitachi (later Kashiwa Reysol). From 1991, he managed the Japan U-20 national team and Japan U-23 national team. At U-23 Japan in 1996 Summer Olympics Qualifiers, Japan qualified to 1996 Summer Olympics for the first time in 28 years since 1968 Summer Olympics, where Japan won the Bronze Medal. At 1996 Olympics, although Japan won 2 matches, Japan lost in the First round. At this time, Japan beat Brazil in first game. It was known as the "Miracle of Miami" (マイアミの奇跡) in Japan.

In 1997, Nishino returned to Kashiwa Reysol and became a coach. In 1998, he became a manager. In 1999, he led the club to win the 1999 J.League Cup. In 2000, the club won the 3rd place in J.League Division 1 for 2 years in a row and he received Best Managers award. However, he was sacked in July 2001. In 2002, he signed with Gamba Osaka. In 2005, the club won J.League Division 1 for the first time in club history and he was elected for the Best Manager award. In 2008, the club won AFC Champions League and the 3rd place at Club World Cup. He was also elected AFC Coach of the Year awards. The club also won the 2007 J.League Cup, the 2008 and the 2009 Emperor's Cup. He resigned in 2011. In May 2012, he signed with Vissel Kobe as Masahiro Wada's successor. However, he was sacked in November. In 2014, he signed with Nagoya Grampus and managed the club until 2015.

In March 2016, Nishino returned to the Japan Football Association as a technical director. In April 2018, Japan national team manager Vahid Halilhodžić was sacked and Nishino was named as the new manager. A big challenge for Nishino was lack of time for preparation, while also being doubted because of his lack of coaching experience. Nonetheless, in the 2018 World Cup, he registered history by helping Japan to beat Colombia 2–1, the first ever defeat of a CONMEBOL team to an Asian side. His brilliant tactics continued to be demonstrated when Japan held Senegal in a 2–2 draw. His Japan lost 0–1 to Poland in the final group match, but as Japan received lesser yellow cards than Senegal, Japan controversially qualified to the knockout stage, becoming the only Asian team to do so in the 2018 World Cup. However, his Japan lost 2–3 to Belgium despite having led 2–0, thus were eliminated from the tournament. Nishino is scheduled to step down once his current term expires at the end of July, following the World Cup.

Nishino consented to take charge of the Thailand's senior and under-23 national sides on 17 July 2019, became the first Asian to coach Thailand, and on 24 January 2020, this contract has been extended until 2022. On 29 July 2021, Football Association of Thailand announced that it had parted ways with Nishino, which was later explained due to Thailand's poor performance in the 2022 FIFA World Cup qualification.

Career statistics

Club

International

Managerial statistics

Honours

Manager
Kashiwa Reysol
J.League Cup: 1999

Gamba Osaka
J.League Division 1: 2005
Emperor's Cup: 2008, 2009
J.League Cup: 2007
Japanese Super Cup: 2007
AFC Champions League: 2008

Individual
Japan Football Hall of Fame: Inducted in 2019

Player
Japan Soccer League Best Eleven: 1985–86

Manager
J.League Manager of the Year: 2000, 2005
AFC Coach of the Year: 2008

References

External links

Japan National Football Team Database

1955 births
Living people
Waseda University alumni
Sportspeople from Saitama (city)
Association football people from Saitama Prefecture
Japanese footballers
Japan international footballers
Japan Soccer League players
Kashiwa Reysol players
Japanese football managers
J1 League managers
Kashiwa Reysol managers
Gamba Osaka managers
Vissel Kobe managers
Nagoya Grampus managers
Japan national football team managers
2018 FIFA World Cup managers
Association football midfielders
Japanese expatriate football managers